The 30th Golden Rooster Awards honoring best Chinese language films which presented during 2014–15. The award ceremony was held in Jilin, Jilin Province, and broadcast by CCTV Movie Channel.

Schedule

Winners and nominees

References

External links 
Official Site

2014-2015
Golden
Gold